Asela de Armas Pérez (6 December 1954 – 7 July 2021) was a Cuban chess player who held the FIDE title of Woman International Master (1978). She was a ten-time winner of the Cuban Women's Chess Championship (1971, 1973, 1974, 1975, 1976, 1977, 1978, 1979, 1986, 1988).

Biography
From the early 1970s to the late 1980s, she was one of the leading Cuban women's chess players. Asela de Armas Pérez won the Cuban Women's Chess Championships ten times: 1971, 1973, 1974, 1975, 1976, 1977, 1978, 1979, 1986, 1988. In 1978, she was awarded the FIDE Woman International Master (WIM) title.

Asela de Armas Pérez three times participated in the Women's World Chess Championship Interzonal Tournaments:
 In 1979, at Interzonal Tournament in Alicante shared 11th-12th place;
 In 1985, at Interzonal Tournament in Havana shared 11th-12th place;
 In 1987, at Interzonal Tournament in Smederevska Palanka has ranked 14th place.

Asela de Armas Pérez played for Cuba in the Women's Chess Olympiads:
 In 1984, at second board in the 26th Chess Olympiad (women) in Thessaloniki (+2, =5, -4),
 In 1986, at second board in the 27th Chess Olympiad (women) in Dubai (+3, =5, -4),
 In 1988, at first board in the 28th Chess Olympiad (women) in Thessaloniki (+3, =1, -6),
 In 1990, at second board in the 29th Chess Olympiad (women) in Novi Sad (+3, =2, -3).

FIDE ratings

References

External links
 
 
 

1954 births
2021 deaths
Cuban female chess players
Chess Olympiad competitors
Chess Woman International Masters
People from Santa Clara, Cuba